The 1994 Star World Championships were held in San Diego, United States between September 7 and 18, 1994. The hosting yacht club was San Diego Yacht Club.

Results

References

Star World Championships
1994 in sailing
Star World Championships in the United States